Bazil Marian (7 November 1922 – 19 January 2008) was a Romanian professional footballer and coach.

Club career
Bazil Marian nicknamed "Bombardierul" (The Bomber) because of his powerful shots was born on 7 November 1922 in Uioara de Sus, Romania and started playing junior level football at age 11 at local club Solvay. He made his Divizia A debut playing for Victoria Cluj on 24 September 1947 in a 2–1 home victory against Venus București. Victoria relegated by the end of the season, but he stayed in Divizia A, playing one season for Mica Brad before moving at Carmen București. At Carmen in December 1946 in a game against Ciocanul București at the score of 4–0 he ran alone towards the opposite goal, dribbled the goalkeeper, after which he sat down with his bottom on the ball and his hand over his eyes, as if looking for his opponents, before pushing the ball into the net. At the end of the season, following another victory against Ciocanul with 6–0 in which he scored two goals, the Carmen team was dissolved by the Communist regime that just took over the country, so he and teammate Valentin Stănescu wanted to flee to Italy, going on a ship from the Port of Constanța but were caught by the authorities who told them that they can choose from either going to jail or play for a working-class team such as Locomotiva București and both of them chose the latter. At Locomotiva he managed to score 32 goals in 24 appearances in the 1947–48 Divizia A season but did not win the top-goalscorer of the league as ITA Arad's Ladislau Bonyhádi scored a record of 49 goals. In 1950 in a game against CFR Timișoara, The Bomber scored a goal with a powerful shot from 18 meters that broke the net and after the game the opponents goalkeeper, Dumitru Pavlovici said:"I am the happiest that Marian's bomb was a goal. Otherwise, if his kick would have hit me in full, I would have gone straight to the hospital". At the end of the 1951 Divizia A season, Locomotiva relegated to Divizia B but Marian stayed with the club, helping it promote back to the first league after one season, also in a match played in a cold weather against Metalul București he scored a goal which was cancelled by the referee so he ran to the fence from the stands, where boiled țuică was sold and drank a cup, afterwards coming back to the pitch, scoring another goal which the referee cancelled again so he went to drink another cup of țuică, then he went and shook the referee's hand and asked to be replaced, leaving the pitch saying that if he scores another goal and it gets cancelled, he'll have to drink another cup and he will get drunk. He retired to start his coaching career after playing for Locomotiva on 14 November 1954 in a Divizia A match which ended with a 3–2 loss against Progresul Oradea, however six years later at age 39 he came out of retirement after he promoted Jiul Petroșani to the first league because the squad wasn't too strong, playing 14 games in which he scored two goals.

International career
Bazil Marian played 18 games and scored two goals at international level for Romania, making his debut on 1 June 1941 under coach Virgil Economu in a friendly which ended with a 4–1 loss. He scored his first goal for the national team in a 2–2 friendly against Slovakia, afterwards making two appearances at the 1946 Balkan Cup, played four games in which he scored a goal in a 3–2 away victory against Bulgaria at the 1947 Balkan Cup and made two appearances at the 1948 Balkan Cup. Marian's last appearance for the national team took place on 8 May 1949 in a home friendly which ended with a 2–1 victory against Poland.

International goals
Scores and results list Romania's goal tally first, score column indicates score after each Marian goal.

Managerial career
Bazil Marian started coaching in 1954 at juniors and as an assistant for six years at Rapid București. He started to work as head coach in the 1960–61 Divizia B season at Jiul Petroșani, helping it earn promotion to Divizia A, however the team relegated after one season. He went on to coach Viitorul București, shortly afterwards moving at Romania's under 21 national team and in 1967 he was coach at Romania's senior national team for one friendly game which ended 1–1 against Uruguay, that took place in Montevideo on Estadio Gran Parque Central. Marian won his first trophy as a coach in 1968 when he guided Dinamo București to win the 1967–68 Cupa României after a 3–1 victory in the final against Rapid București which was coached by his former Carmen București teammate, Valentin Stănescu. Marian went to have some short spells at Farul Constanța and Argeș Pitești before going at Rapid București where he won the 1971–72 Cupa României after a 2–0 victory in the final against Jiul Petroșani. At Rapid he also had his first European performances, helping the team reach the eight-finals in the 1971–72 UEFA Cup campaign after eliminating, for the first time in the history of Romanian football, an Italian team, Napoli, afterwards eliminating Legia Warsaw, being eliminated by the team who would eventually win the competition, Tottenham, also taking part in the 1972–73 European Cup Winners' Cup campaign when the team reached the quarter-finals, eliminating Landskrona BoIS and Rapid Wien. In 1973 he went to coach abroad in Algeria at Boufarik and JS Kabylie, afterwards returning for one season at Rapid București and from 1979 until his retirement at age 67 in 1989 he coached Romania's under 21 national team. Bazil Marian died on 19 January 2008 in Bucharest at age 85 after suffering from Alzheimer's disease in the last years of his life, being buried in the town's Andronache cemetery.

Honours

Player
Locomotiva București
Divizia B: 1952

Manager
Jiul Petroșani
Divizia B: 1960–61
Dinamo București
Cupa României: 1967–68
Rapid București
Cupa României: 1971–72

Notes

References

External links

Bazil Marian player profile at Labtof.ro
Bazil Marian manager profile at Labtof.ro

1922 births
2008 deaths
People from Ocna Mureș
Romanian footballers
Romania international footballers
Association football midfielders
Association football forwards
Liga I players
Liga II players
FC Rapid București players
FC Carmen București players
Victoria Cluj players
Romanian football managers
FC Rapid București managers
CSM Jiul Petroșani managers
FC Dinamo București managers
FCV Farul Constanța managers
FC Argeș Pitești managers
JS Kabylie managers
Romania national football team managers
Romanian expatriate football managers
Expatriate football managers in Algeria
Romanian expatriate sportspeople in Algeria
WA Boufarik managers